Solovka is a railway station that is located in a village of Solovka, Uzhhorod Raion in Zakarpattia Oblast. It is part of the Uzhhorod administration (Lviv Railways). The station became a border crossing when the checkpoint was transferred from Batievo to Solovka that is located closer to the border.

The station is an important freight transportation gateway to Ukraine. The station is located in the vicinity of Chop where is located the main railway station in the region. It is located near a railway bridge over Tysa. Solovka serves freight trains exclusively.

See also
 Hungary-Ukraine border

References

External links

!Previous station!!!!Operator!!!!Next Station

Railway stations in Zakarpattia Oblast
Lviv Railways stations
Hungary–Ukraine border crossings